The Kunsthaus Graz, Grazer Kunsthaus, or Graz Art Museum was built as part of the European Capital of Culture celebrations in 2003 and has since become an architectural landmark in Graz, Austria. Its exhibition program specializes in contemporary art from the 1960s onwards.

Architecture 
Kunsthaus Graz was designed by Colin Fournier and Sir Peter Cook. According to The Bartlett School of Architecture at University College London, the Kunsthaus' design sought to be deliberately provocative, innovate museum design by offering a less "institutional" approach to organising exhibition spaces and employs new materials and manufacturing techniques. The building is an example of blob architecture, and has a skin made of iridescent blue acrylic panels that also double as photovoltaic panels. Owing to its shape contrasting with its surroundings, it is known in local vernacular as the "Friendly Alien". or rather as the black tumor.

The building incorporates the façade of the Eisernes Haus, a iron-framed structure built in 1848.

Concept 
Architecture, design, new media, internet art, film, and photography are united under one roof. Kunsthaus Graz was developed as an institution to stage international exhibitions of multidisciplinary, modern and contemporary art from the 1960s to the present day. It does not collect art, maintains no permanent exhibitions and does not have its own depot. Rather, its exclusive purpose is to present and procure contemporary art productions.

As founding director, Peter Pakesch was responsible for the orientation and the program of the Kunsthaus between the administration in 2003 and the end of his directorship at the Universalmuseum Joanneum.

BIX Façade 

The BIX Façade of the museum represents a singular fusion from architecture and New Media and is based on a concept of the Berliner architects realities:united. BIX, a name which consists of the words "Big" and "pixels", is the acrylic glass skin of the eastern side of the building, which consists of 930 fluorescent lamps whose brightness can be individually adjusted. Variable at 20 frames per second, the facade can be used as a large screen for films and animations in what is referred to as a "communicative display skin".

The BIX facade concept was entered into the permanent Architecture and Design Collection of the Museum of Modern Art (MoMA) in New York in 2011.

Other 
On 1 May 2011, the Austrian Postal Service released a postage stamp commemorating the object as part of the Kunsthäuser permanent stamp series.

To mark the tenth anniversary of the Kunsthaus, Ingo J. Biermann, Fiene Scharp and Kai Miedendorp made a short half-documentary film in and about the building. The film Astronaut's Ark was conceived for the Kultur:Stadt exhibition, which took place from March to June 2013 at the Akademie der Künste (Berlin) and from July to October 2013 at the Kunsthaus Graz.

Literature 
 Cook, Peter & Fournier, Colin. A Friendly Alien: Ein Kunsthaus fur Graz. Hatje Cantz Publishers. September 30, 2004.

References

External links 

 Kunsthaus Graz
  The geometry of the Kunsthaus Graz
  BIX Medienfassade

Art museums and galleries in Austria
Buildings and structures completed in 2003
Architecture in Austria
Postmodern architecture
Expressionist architecture
Buildings and structures in Graz
Museums in Graz
Art galleries established in 2003
2003 establishments in Austria
Tourist attractions in Graz
21st-century architecture in Austria